World Series of Fighting 16: Palhares vs. Fitch was a mixed martial arts event held  in Sacramento, California, United States. This event aired on NBCSN in the U.S and on TSN2 in Canada.

Background
WSOF 16 featured two championship title bouts: 
The main event was a fight for the WSOF Welterweight Championship between champion Rousimar Palhares and challenger Jon Fitch.

The co-main event was a fight for the WSOF Featherweight Championship between champion Rick Glenn and Lance Palmer.

Results

See also 
 World Series of Fighting
 List of WSOF champions
 List of WSOF events

References

World Series of Fighting events
2014 in mixed martial arts
Events in Sacramento, California